Valentino Bon Jovi Bong (born 14 February 1989) is a professional squash player who has represented Malaysia. He is also a coach.

Early life
Bong was born on 14 February 1989 in Kuching, Sarawak in Malaysia. He was born to a Filipino mother, Cavite-native Gloria de Dios, and a Malaysian father who works as an officer at the Malaysian customs. Bong is the eldest child among four siblings.

Playing career
Valentino Bong has represented Malaysia in international tournaments. He has competed at the men's double event at the 2014 Commonwealth Games and at the men's team event of the 2015 Southeast Asian Games where he helped his team win the gold medal.

At the 2016 Southeast Asian Cup, Bong achieved the men's individual squash title.

He plans to play for the Philippines at the 2018 Asian Games and 2019 Southeast Asian Games after he meets the requirements of three years residency in the Philippines and a Philippine passport needed for a sporting nationality transfer.

Coaching career
He joined the national squash team of the Philippines in January 2017 as its coach.

References

External links
 

Malaysian male squash players
1989 births
People from Kuching
Filipino people of Malaysian descent
Malaysian people of Filipino descent
Squash players at the 2014 Commonwealth Games
Living people
Southeast Asian Games medalists in squash
Southeast Asian Games gold medalists for Malaysia
Competitors at the 2015 Southeast Asian Games
Commonwealth Games competitors for Malaysia